This is a list of members of the 43rd Legislative Assembly of Queensland from 1980 to 1983, as elected at the 1980 state election held on 29 November 1980.

 The National member for Callide, Lindsay Hartwig, was expelled from his party in 1981 following his trenchant criticism of the Premier and the party in the media and in Parliament. He served out the remainder of his term as an independent.
 The Liberal members for Mansfield and Windsor,  Bill Kaus and Bob Moore respectively, joined the National Party on 13 July 1983.

See also
1980 Queensland state election
Premier: Joh Bjelke-Petersen (National Party) (1968–1987)

References

Members of Queensland parliaments by term
20th-century Australian politicians